August Sutter (28 November 1926 – 21 March 2011) was a Swiss long-distance runner. He competed in the men's 5000 metres at the 1952 Summer Olympics.

References

External links
 

1926 births
2011 deaths
Athletes (track and field) at the 1952 Summer Olympics
Swiss male long-distance runners
Olympic athletes of Switzerland
Place of birth missing